BC Youth Coalition is a non-partisan youth organization in British Columbia, Canada, initiated by a group of high school students. It aims to enhance the engagement of youth in the society, especially high-school students who, despite having passion and creative ideas, often lack direct means to influence the political process.

Executive members
The executive member of the organization are:

President: Gary Sipeng Xie
VP Finance: Peter Zhang
VP Outreach: Spencer Lamirand
VP Membership: Daryl Tang
VP Sponsorship: Ison Cheng
VP Organization: Raaj Chatterjee
Chief Photographer: Zara Che
Other members: Cameron McLeod, Edward Qi, Sandy Song, Eva Liang, Johnson Han

Political party 

From July 2000 to March 2009, there was a registered political party called the British Columbia Youth Coalition.

In the 2005 BC provincial election, it nominated two candidates:
Augustine Lee won 260 votes (1.29% of the total) in the riding of Chilliwack-Suma, and
 Colin Wormworth won 100 votes (0.51%) in Chilliwack-Kent.

See also
 List of British Columbia political parties

Youth Coalition
Youth politics